Hypatima parichniota is a moth in the family Gelechiidae. It was described by Edward Meyrick in 1938. It is found in Yunnan, China.

References

Hypatima
Taxa named by Edward Meyrick
Moths described in 1938